Arnhold's mouse lemur or the Montagne d'Ambre mouse lemur (Microcebus arnholdi) is a species of mouse lemur endemic to Madagascar.  Its holotype was first collected on 27 November 2005, and was first described in 2008.  According to genetic tests, it is genetically distinct from its closest sister taxa, the Sambirano mouse lemur (M. sambiranensis).

It is found in the montane rainforest of Montagne d’Ambre National Park and Montagne d'Ambre Special Reserve in northern Madagascar.

Etymology
The name arnholdi was chosen in honor of Henry Arnhold of New York, whose focus on linking the well-being of people in developing countries to the protection of critically important biodiversity hotspots helped create Conservation International's Healthy Communities Initiative and Conservation Stewards' Program.

Anatomy and physiology

The dorsal pelage is dark brown, red and gray, with a dark brown midline dorsal stripe running down the base of the tail.  The tail has a dark brown tip.  The ventral pelage is white to cream, with gray undertones.  The head is red, with dark brown on the muzzle and around the eyes.  There is also a white nose ridge that stops at the distal end of the muzzle.

Distribution
Arnhold's mouse lemur is found in the montane rainforest of Montagne d'Ambre National Park and Montagne d'Ambre Special Reserve, northwest of the Irodo River in the Antsiranana Province of Madagascar.

The southern end of the Arnhold's mouse lemur's range is bordered by the range of the northern rufous mouse lemur (M. tavaratra), forming a significant species barrier between it and its genetically closest sister taxa, the Sambirano mouse lemur (M. sambiranensis), further to the southwest.

References

Mammals described in 2008
Mouse lemurs